Palpita hypohomalia is a moth in the family Crambidae. It was described by Inoue in 1996. It is found in Taiwan, China (Guizhou) and Thailand.

References

Moths described in 1996
Palpita
Moths of Asia